The Cold Light of Day or Cold Light of Day may refer to:

 The Cold Light of Day (2012 film), an American espionage action thriller
 The Cold Light of Day, a 1996 film directed by Rudolf van den Berg and a remake of Es geschah am hellichten Tag
 Cold Light of Day (1989 film), a 1989 British film (see 47th Venice International Film Festival)

See also
 Light of Day, a 1987 American drama film